Kwa, Quu or Ka with descender (Қ қ; italics: Қ қ) is a letter of the Cyrillic script used in a number of non-Slavic languages spoken in the territory of the former Soviet Union, including:
 the Turkic languages Kazakh, Uighur, Uzbek and several smaller languages (Karakalpak, Shor and Tofa), where it represents the voiceless uvular plosive .
 Iranian languages such as Tajik and Ossetic (before 1924; now superseded by the digraph ). Since  is represented by the letter ق qāf in the Arabic alphabet, Қ is sometimes referred to as "Cyrillic Qaf".
 Eastern varieties of the Khanty language, where it also represents .
 the Abkhaz language where it represents the voiceless velar plosive . (The Cyrillic letter Ka (К к) is used to represent .) It was introduced in 1905 for the spelling of Abkhaz. From 1928 to 1938, Abkhaz was spelled with the Latin alphabet, and the corresponding letter was the Latin letter K with descender (Ⱪ ⱪ).

Computing codes

See also
Other Cyrillic letters used to write the sound :
Ӄ ӄ : Cyrillic letter Ka with hook
Ҡ ҡ : Cyrillic letter Bashkir Qa
Ԛ ԛ : Cyrillic letter Qa
Ԟ ԟ : Cyrillic letter Aleut Ka
Cyrillic characters in Unicode

Kazakh language
Uzbek language
Uyghur language
Tajik language
Cyrillic letters with diacritics
Letters with descender (diacritic)